Nebraska Public Media, formerly Nebraska Educational Telecommunications (NET), is a state network of public radio and television stations in the U.S. state of Nebraska. It is operated by the Nebraska Educational Telecommunications Commission (NETC). The television stations are all members of the Public Broadcasting Service (PBS), while the radio stations are members of National Public Radio (NPR).

The network is headquartered in the Terry M. Carpenter & Jack G. McBride Nebraska Public Media Center which is located at 1800 North 33rd Street on the East campus of the University of Nebraska in Lincoln, and has a satellite studio in Omaha.

History

Television
Nebraska was one of the first states in the nation to begin the groundwork for educational broadcasting. The University of Nebraska successfully applied to have channel 18 in Lincoln allocated for educational use in 1951.

Meanwhile, broadcasting pioneer John Fetzer purchased Lincoln's two commercial TV stations, KOLN-TV (channel 12) in August 1953 and KFOR-TV (channel 10) in February 1954. In order to avoid running afoul of Federal Communications Commission (FCC) ownership regulations and to create a commercial broadcast monopoly for himself in the Lincoln market, Fetzer moved KOLN from its sign-on channel 12 to KFOR's channel 10 and offered to donate the channel 12 license to UNL. Since this would allow UNL to use more signal at less cost, the school quickly jumped at this proposal. KUON-TV went on the air on November 1, 1954, from KOLN-TV's studios, where the stations had to take turns using studio space; when KOLN was live, KUON had to broadcast a film, and vice versa. The station joined the nascent National Educational Television network (which had begun operations in May) upon its sign-on. It was operated in trust for UNL until 1956, when the FCC granted the channel 12 license to the school's Board of Regents. In 1957, KUON moved to its own studios in the Temple Building on the UNL campus. In 1960, the Nebraska Council for Educational Television was created by six school districts in Nebraska. By 1961, five VHF and three UHF channels were allocated for educational use in Nebraska—the largest set ever approved for educational use in a single state. In 1963, the state legislature, per a committee's recommendation, approved plans for a statewide educational television network under the control of the Nebraska Educational Television Commission. A deal was quickly reached in which Lincoln's KUON-TV would remain under UNL's ownership, but serve as the new state network's flagship.

In 1965, KLNE-TV in Lexington became the first station in the new state network, followed a month later (October 1965) by KYNE-TV at channel 26 in Omaha. The state network grew quickly; six stations signed on from 1966 to 1968 to complete the state network. It began a full seven-day schedule in 1969. The Nebraska Educational Telecommunications Center opened in 1972; it is named for Carpenter, a state senator who introduced legislation in 1969 to fund the center, and McBride, NET's founding general manager and leader for 43 years. (The KLNE-TV and KLNE-FM transmission tower  is on the site of the World War II prisoner-of-war camp, Camp Atlanta, near Holdrege, Nebraska.) National Educational Television would be absorbed into the Public Broadcasting Service (PBS) in October 1970, and KUON-TV joined the new network.

In 1974, Nebraska ETV adopted a new logo – a red stylized abstract "N" formed from two trapezoids. A year later, NBC unveiled the same logo that Nebraska ETV was using, but for the blue coloring of the right trapezoid in the NBC logo. The commission sued NBC for trademark infringement in February 1976, a suit which generated national attention. In an out-of-court settlement, Nebraska ETV agreed to allow NBC to keep its logo. In return, NBC donated a color mobile unit and other equipment totaling over $800,000. It also paid the commission an additional $55,000 for the costs of rolling out a new logo and eliminating the old logo from all advertising; Nebraska ETV's new logo was unveiled in late 1976.

A CPB study, Study of School Use of Television and Video, found Reading Rainbow (a co-production of NET and Buffalo, New York's WNED-TV until 2006) to be the most used and viewed children's television program in America during the 1990–1991 school year.

Since 1974, NET has operated a studio in Omaha, on the campus of the University of Nebraska–Omaha. It is primarily used when KYNE breaks off from the state network to broadcast programming of specific interest to the Omaha market.

In January 2005, Nebraska ETV and Nebraska Public Radio were united under a single name, Nebraska Educational Telecommunications.

In May 2021, NET changed its name to Nebraska Public Media to more accurately represent the organization's entire impact.

Radio
The Educational Television Commission had its mission broadened to radio in 1984, but it was 1989 before it could begin the groundwork for building a statewide public radio network. For many years, there were only two NPR members in the entire state—Omaha's KIOS and Lincoln's KUCV, which had signed on in 1974. In 1989, however, UNL bought KUCV from Union College. KUCV officially relaunched from its new studios on October 10, 1989. In 2001, KUCV moved from 90.9 FM (where it had been since its sign-on) to 91.1.

In 1990, the commission opened stations in Alliance, Lexington, Columbus, Norfolk, and Hastings. North Platte, Bassett, Merriman, and Chadron followed in 1991. The entire Nebraska Public Radio Network (NPRN) was formally dedicated on October 8 in a special ceremony, broadcast live on NPRN and NETV.

The Nebraska Educational Telecommunications Facilities Corporation was established to facilitate lease/purchase of the GTE SpaceNet 3 transponder.

Television stations
Nebraska Public Media consists of nine full-power TV stations that make up the network; all stations have callsigns beginning with the letter K, as licensed by the Federal Communications Commission (FCC), and ending in NE (the postal abbreviation for Nebraska) except "UON" (University of Nebraska) for the Lincoln station. Combined, they reach almost all of Nebraska, as well as parts of Colorado, Iowa, Kansas, Missouri, South Dakota, and Wyoming. Eight of the stations are owned by the NETC. Flagship station KUON is owned by the University of Nebraska, but is operated by the Commission through a long-standing agreement between the Commission and NU.

Note:
1. KYNE occasionally breaks off from the Nebraska Public Media state network to broadcast local programming. KYNE's programming became digital-only on February 17, 2009.
2. KUON-TV launched on February 18, 1953 as KOLN-TV, changed its callsign to KUON on August 5, 1954 and added the -TV suffix to its callsign on November 1, 1954.

Translators
Nebraska Public Media operates 15 translators to widen its coverage area. Nine directly repeat KUON, four repeat KXNE and one repeats KMNE.

Cable and satellite availability
Nebraska Public Media is available on nearly all cable systems in Nebraska. Selected cable systems in northern Kansas carry Hastings' KHNE in addition to Smoky Hills PBS; these counties are part of the Hastings/Kearney side of the Lincoln/Hastings/Kearney media market. Additionally, Omaha's KYNE is carried on most cable systems in southwestern Iowa.

On satellite, KUON, KYNE, KPNE, KXNE, and KTNE are carried on the local Lincoln, Omaha, North Platte, Sioux City, and Cheyenne, Wyoming Dish Network feeds, respectively. KTNE is the sole PBS station available to satellite viewers in the Cheyenne market, due to FCC regulations that prohibit Wyoming PBS to be seen in that market, since KWYP-TV in Laramie is located in the Denver television market. KHNE, KYNE, and KXNE are available on the Lincoln, Omaha, and Sioux City DirecTV feeds, respectively.

Digital television

Digital channels 
The digital signals of Nebraska Public Media's stations are multiplexed:

Analog-to-digital conversion
During 2009, in the lead-up to the analog-to-digital television transition that would ultimately occur in 2009, Nebraska Public Media shut down the analog transmitters of its stations on a staggered basis. Listed below are the dates each analog transmitter ceased operations as well as their post-transition channel allocations:
 KUON-TV shut down its analog signal, over VHF channel 12, in Autumn 2008. The station's digital signal relocated from its pre-transition UHF channel 40 to VHF channel 12.
 KHNE-TV shut down its analog signal, over UHF channel 29, on February 17, 2009, the original date in which full-power television stations in the United States were to transition from analog to digital broadcasts under federal mandate (which was later pushed back to June 12, 2009). The station's digital signal remained on its pre-transition UHF channel 28. Through the use of PSIP, digital television receivers display the station's virtual channel as its former UHF analog channel 29.
 KLNE-TV shut down its analog signal, over VHF channel 3, on February 17, 2009. The station's digital signal remained on its pre-transition UHF channel 26. Through the use of PSIP, digital television receivers display the station's virtual channel as its former VHF analog channel 3.
 KMNE-TV shut down its analog signal, over VHF channel 7, in Autumn 2008. The station's digital signal relocated from its pre-transition UHF channel 15 to VHF channel 7.
 KPNE-TV shut down its analog signal, over VHF channel 9, in Autumn 2008. The station's digital signal relocated from its pre-transition UHF channel 16 to VHF channel 9.
 KRNE-TV shut down its analog signal, over VHF channel 12, in Autumn 2008. The station's digital signal relocated from its pre-transition UHF channel 17 to VHF channel 12.
 KTNE-TV shut down its analog signal, over VHF channel 13, in Autumn 2008. The station's digital signal relocated from its pre-transition UHF channel 24 to VHF channel 13.
 KXNE-TV shut down its analog signal, over UHF channel 19, in November 2008. The station's digital signal relocated from its pre-transition UHF channel 16 to former UHF analog channel 19.
 KYNE-TV shut down its analog signal, over UHF channel 26, on February 17, 2009. The station's digital signal remained on its pre-transition UHF channel 17. Through the use of PSIP, digital television receivers display the station's virtual channel as its former UHF analog channel 26.

Radio stations 
Nebraska Public Media's radio stations are governed by the NET Commission and the NET Foundation for Radio Board. It consists of all NPR member stations in the state except for KIOS in Omaha; that station is operated by the Omaha Public Schools. Programming consists of classical music and NPR news and talk.

Nebraska Public Media broadcasts two HD Radio channels. The first is a simulcast of the analog signal, while the second airs increased news programming as well as jazz. Both stream live on the Internet. National radio programming carried on the radio network is distributed by NPR. Nebraska Public Media's radio service is committed to providing programs that inform, entertain, and inspire most of the communities of Nebraska.

Nebraska Public Media's main radio channel can also be heard on the FNX xx.5 television channel over the air by choosing Spanish in either the SAP or multi-language option.  

Radio Talking Book, a service for the visually-impaired, can be heard on the FNX xx.5 television channel over the air by choosing French in either the SAP or multi-language option.  

There are nine full-power stations in the state network:

The state network also has five low-power repeater/translator signals.

Programming 
Although Nebraska Public Media provides PBS programming, it also produces original programs, such as:
 Nebraska Stories
 Backyard Farmer
 Big Red Wrap Up
 Nebraska Legislation
 Consider This...
 Speaking of Nebraska
 Nebraska Cornhuskers women's volleyball
 Nebraska Cornhuskers baseball
 High School Bowling
 NSAA High School Championships: a series of high school girls' and boys' championships events on most Saturdays including:
 Basketball (Girls 1st Saturday of March, and Boys 2nd Saturday of March)
 Football (3rd Monday & Tuesday of November)
 Soccer (Boys 3rd Monday of May, and Girls 3rd Tuesday of May)
 Speech (March or April)
 Swimming & Diving (Last Saturday of February or some 1st Saturday of March)
 Volleyball (2nd Saturday of November)
 Wrestling (3rd Saturday of February).

News operation
The Nebraska Public Media News team was led by News Director Dennis Kellogg until 2022. The news department produces regular "Signature Stories" for air on Nebraska Public Media's radio stations.

References

External links
Official website
NET History
Nebraska Stories website
Listen Live

PBS member networks
Television stations in Nebraska
NPR member networks
Radio stations in Nebraska
University of Nebraska–Lincoln
Companies based in Lincoln, Nebraska
Radio broadcasting companies of the United States
Television channels and stations established in 1954
1954 establishments in Nebraska